The Donald River is a short tributary of the Waiatoto River within Mount Aspiring National Park.

References

Westland District
Rivers of the West Coast, New Zealand
Mount Aspiring National Park
Rivers of New Zealand